This is a list of Ohio State University people of whom have some significant affiliation with the school. Individuals listed may have only attended the university at one point and not necessarily have graduated.  Currently there are nearly 500,000 living Ohio State alumni.

National and international award winners

Nobel laureates
 Leon Cooper, 1972 Nobel laureate in Physics (Faculty 1957-1958)
 Paul Flory, 1974 Nobel laureate in Chemistry (Ph.D. 1934)
 William A. Fowler, 1983 Nobel laureate in Physics (B.S. 1933)
 Kenneth G. Wilson, 1982 Nobel laureate in Physics (Faculty 1988-2008)

Pulitzer Prize winners
 Walt Bogdanich, Specialized Reporting 1988; National Reporting 2005; Investigative Reporting 2008 (M.A. 1976)
 Paul H. Buck, History 1938 (B.A. 1921, M.A. 1922)
 Julia Keller, Feature Writing 2005 (Ph.D)
 Judith Miller, Explanatory Reporting 2002 (attended briefly)
 Mary Oliver, Poetry 1984 (attended briefly)
 Jim Schaefer, Local Reporting with the Detroit Free Press 2009
Diana Sugg, Best Reporting 2003 (M.A. 1992)

Academia
 Michael F. Adams, former president, University of Georgia (M.A. 1971, Ph.D. 1973)
 Omer Clyde Aderhold, former president, University of Georgia (Ph.D. 1938)
 Carol Anderson, professor of African American studies at Emory University (Ph.D. 1995)
 Steve Ballard, chancellor, East Carolina University (Ph.D. 1976)
 Mahzarin Banaji, Richard Clarke Cabot Professor of Social Ethics at Harvard University (Ph.D.)
 John Bardo, educator, president of Wichita State University, chancellor of Western Carolina University (Ph.D. 1973)
 James Bonk, longtime chemistry professor, Duke University (Ph.D. 1958)
 Lakeyta Bonnette-Bailey, academic
 Douglas Brinkley, director of the Theodore Roosevelt Center for American Civilization at Tulane University (B.A. 1982)
 Molly Corbett Broad, president of the University of North Carolina System (M.S. 1964)
 Paul H. Buck, historian; former provost of Harvard University; awarded 1938 Pulitzer Prize in History (B.A. 1921)
 Calvin Adam Buehler, professor and chair of the Chemistry Department at University of Tennessee (B.S. 1918, M.S. 1920, Ph.D. 1922)
 Robert Buzzanco, professor and chair of the History Department at the University of Houston (Ph.D.)
 Tamal Dey, former professor and chair of the department of computer science and engineering at the Ohio State University
 Neil W. Chamberlain, economist and industrial relations scholar at Yale and Columbia Universities (Ph.D. 1942)
 Helen G. Edmonds, professor of history at North Carolina Central University, first black woman to earn a Ph.D. at Ohio State (1946)
 Perry A. Frey, professor of biochemistry at University of Wisconsin–Madison (B.S. 1959)
 Harold J. Grimm, Professor of History and an expert on the Protestant Reformation (PhD)
 John R. Halstead, President of SUNY-Brockport (Ph.D. 1980)
 Judy Hample, President of the University of Mary Washington (B.A.; M.A.; Ph.D.)
 Harlan Hatcher, former president (1951–1968) of the University of Michigan (B.A.; M.A.; Ph.D.)
 Sam Higginbottom, missionary and founder of Allahabad Agricultural Institute
 Christopher Hirata, astrophysicist (Faculty)
 Charles F. Hockett, linguist, professor at Cornell University (B.A./M.A. 1936)
 Philip G. Hoffman, former president of the University of Houston (1961–1977); first chancellor of the University of Houston System (1977–1979) (Ph.D. 1948)
 Michael Hogan, former history professor; former president of the University of Connecticut; former president of the University of Illinois
 Jacquelyne Jackson, sociologist and academic (Ph.D., 1960)
 Donald Kagan, scholar, Sterling Professor of Classics and History at Yale (Ph.D., 1958)
 Ellyn Kaschak, Emeritus Professor of Psychology, Ohio State University  (Ph.D., 1974)
 David Kier, Professor of History, specializing in modern Germany and Russia (Ph.D.)
 George Kohlrieser, Professor of Leadership and Organizational Behavior, Institute for Management Development IMD, Lausanne (Ph.D. 1988)
 T. V. Rajan Babu, Professor of chemistry at Ohio State University (Ph.D. 1979)
 Murray Krieger, literary critic and theorist, professor at the University of Iowa and the University of California, Irvine (Ph.D. 1952)
 Vijay Kumar, professor in the School of Engineering & Applied Sciences at the University of Pennsylvania (M.Sc. 1985; Ph.D. 1987)
 Arthur Lucas, Principal of King's College London (1993–2003) (Ph.D.)
 David Warren Maurer, professor of linguistics at the University of Louisville and an author of numerous studies of the language of the American underworld (Ph.D.)
 Oliver McGee, former Chair of the Department of Civil & Environmental Engineering & Geodetic Science at The Ohio State University (2001–2005) (B.S. 1981)
 Raymond Mikesell, economist; participant in the Bretton Woods Conference (B.S. Ph.D.)
 Richard Thacker Morris, professor of sociology at the University of California, Los Angeles, chairman of the Sociology Department at UCLA, author (Ph.D. 1952)
 Henry Panion, III, composer, arranger, conductor, educator; professor and chairman in the Department of Music at the University of Alabama at Birmingham (Ph.D.)
 Calie Pistorius, vice chancellor and principal of the University of Pretoria in South Africa (M.S. 1984; Ph.D. 1986)
 Wynetka Ann Reynolds, former president of the University of Alabama at Birmingham (1997–2003); former chancellor of the City University of New York (1990–1997); former chancellor of the California State University system (1982–1990); former provost at the Ohio State University (1979–1982); director of Abbott Laboratories, Invitrogen Corporation, Humana Inc., and Owens Corning
 Michael J. Saks, professor of law and psychology at Arizona State University; president of the American Psychology-Law Society; editor of the scientific journal Law and Human Behavior (Ph.D., 1975)
 Arthur M. Schlesinger, Sr., historian namesake of Schlesinger Library at Harvard University (B.A. 1910)
 Gene Sharp, political scientist; founder of the Albert Einstein Institution; his writings on nonviolent revolution have been credited with providing the intellectual underpinnings for democratic movements around the world (B.A. 1949; M.A. 1951)
 Amit P. Sheth, professor at Wright State University and director of Kno.e.sis Center (M.S. 1983; Ph.D. 1985)
 Paul Torgersen, president of Virginia Tech (M.S. 1956; Ph.D. 1959)
 Quentin D. Wheeler, President, State University of New York College of Environmental Science and Forestry (BS 1976; MS 1977; PhD 1980)
 Nancy L. Zimpher, Chancellor, State University of New York system (BA 1968; M.A. 1971; Ph.D. 1976)

Arts and literature
 Berenice Abbott, photographer (attended briefly)
 James Akins, Principal Tubist, Columbus Symphony Orchestra (B.M. 1978; M.M. 1982)
 John Backderf, a.k.a. Derf, political and satirical writer, cartoonist
 Brian Basset,  cartoonist and painter; editorial cartoonist for The Seattle Times 1978–1994; creator of the comic strip Adam@Home 1984–2009, creator of the comic strip Red and Rover 2000– (1975–1978; attended but did not graduate)
 George Wesley Bellows, painter (1905) (attended but did not graduate)
 Lois McMaster Bujold, science fiction novelist (attended but did not graduate)
 Ron Burch, writer (BS; MA)
 Rosaria Butterfield, author (PhD 1992)
 Milton Caniff, cartoonist (1930)
 Charles Csuri,  artist and scholar; father of digital art and computer animation (BFA; MFA)
 Harlan Ellison, science fiction writer (attended but did not graduate; expelled)
 Dorothy Canfield Fisher, novelist and education activist (B.A. 1899)
 Brian Gage, author of satire, fairy tales, and fiction (B.S. 1996)
 Jan Groover, photographer noted for her use of emerging color technologies (M.A. 1970)
 Virginia Hamilton, author (M.A. 1958)
 Karen Harper, author (B.A. 1967, M.A. 1969)
 Chester Himes, "the black Raymond Chandler"; writer; of hard-boiled detective novels including Cotton Comes to Harlem (attended one year only)
 Velina Hasu Houston, playwright
 Kermit Hunter, playwright (B.A. 1931)
 John Jakes, author (M.A. 1954)
 Kerry G. Johnson, caricaturist and cartoonist (B.F.A 1989)
 Adrienne Kennedy, playwright, multiple Obie Award recipient, Guggenheim Fellow (B.A. 1953)
 David Kier, novelist and historian
 Betina Krahn, author (B.S.)
 Jerome Lawrence, playwright (B.A. 1937)
 Samella Lewis, artist, printmaker, art historian and scholar of African-American art, first African-American woman to receive a doctorate in fine arts and art history (M.A. 1948 Ph.D. 1951)
 Roy Lichtenstein, artist (BFA, 1946; MFA, 1949; honorary doctorate, 1988)
 Rick Mills, art educator, glass artist (BFA, 1980)
 Stephen Montague, composer and worldwide touring musician (2000 distinguished alumnus) (Ph.D. 1972)
 Aimee Nezhukumatathil, poet (B.A. and M.F.A. 1996/2000)
 Phil Ochs, 1960s and 70s folk singer, anti-war activist; majored in journalism
 Cynthia Ozick, author (M.A., 1950)
 Paul Palnik, cartoon artist and writer; some original drawings are in the collection of the Ohio State University Libraries (BFA, 1968; MA 1969)
 Joseph W. Papin, reportorial artist, illustrator, courtroom artist, editorial artist (B.A. 1955)
 Clayton Rawson, mystery writer (B.A. 1929)
 Christopher Ries, glass sculptor (BFA, 1975)
 Frank Schmalleger, professor and author (Ph.D., 1974)
 Loren Singer, screenwriter and novelist (B.A., 1947)
 Jeff Smith, Eisner Award-winning cartoonist; creator of the comic book series Bone (B.A.)
Maggie Smith, poet, freelance writer, and editor (MFA)
 Samuel Steward, professor and author (see also Phil Andros) (Ph.D., 1934)
 R. L. Stine, children's author of Goosebumps series (B.A., 1965)
 Julia Suits, cartoonist for The New Yorker  (M.F.A., Sculpture, 1982)
 Graeme Sullivan, artist, author, art theorist, and educator (M.A. and Ph.D. 1984)
 James Thurber, author and humorist (attended but did not graduate
 Jon Whitcomb, illustrator whose style became highly influential in mid-century American magazines (B.A.)

Business
 Dan Amstutz, influential expert on agriculture trade with Goldman Sachs, as Ambassador and Chief Negotiator for Agriculture during the Uruguay Round General Agreement on Tariffs and Trade and later Executive Director of the International Wheat Council in London, England (B.S. 1954)
 Emily E. Douglas, founder and CEO of Grandma's Gifts (M.L.H.R. 2007, M.B.A. 2009)
 Max M. Fisher, philanthropist and businessman; significant donor to and the namesake of the Fisher College of Business at Ohio State (B.S. 1930)
 Mark Frissora, former CEO of Caesars Entertainment, former CEO of The Hertz Corporation and Tenneco (B.A. 1977)
 Yang Huiyan, real estate developer; China's wealthiest woman, with a $16.2 billion net worth in 2007 (B.A.)
 Paul F. Iams, founder of Iams (B.S. 1937)
 William M. Isaac, board member & chairman, Federal Deposit Insurance Corporation from 1978  through 1985, and current Co-Chairman & CEO The Isaac-Milstein Group (J.D., summa cum laude,1969)
 Vyomesh Joshi, Executive Vice President, HP Imaging and Printing Group (M.S. Electrical Engineering 1980)
 Fred Lazarus, Jr., founder of Federated Department Stores
 John C. Lincoln, inventor, entrepreneur, philanthropist and in 1924, the Vice-Presidential candidate under the Commonwealth Land Party ticket. He held 55 patents on several electrical devices, founded the Lincoln Electric Co., invested in the construction of the Camelback Inn, presided over he Bagdad Mine and funded two hospitals in Phoenix, one which bears his name.
 Abraham M. Lurie, developer of Marina del Rey
 Robert E. Murray, founder and CEO of Murray Energy Corporation, one of the largest coal mine operators in the world
 Phuthuma Nhleko, CEO of MTN Group, South Africa's largest telecommunications company (B.S. 1983)
 Walden O'Dell, CEO of Diebold
 Edward J. Orton, Jr., Columbus philanthropist, founded the Standard Pyrometric Cone Company
 Alan Patricof, venture capitalist and founder of Apax Partners (B.S.)
 James E. Rohr, Chairman and CEO of PNC Financial Services Group (B.S. M.B.A.)
 Frederick Gale Ruffner, Jr., founder and former owner of Gale Research, reference work publisher sold for $66 million to International Thomson in 1985 (B.A., 1950)
 Robert R. Ruffolo, Jr,  Senior Vice President of Wyeth and President of Wyeth Research (B.S. 1973; Ph.D. 1976)
 Alex Schoenbaum, founder of Shoney's Restaurants (B.S. 1939)
 Deven Sharma, President, Standard & Poor's (Ph.D.)
 George Steinbrenner, one-time head of Cleveland's American Shipbuilding Company; former owner of the New York Yankees, former OSU graduate assistant under Woody Hayes; deceased (M.A. 1955 in physical education)
 Leslie Wexner, CEO, chairman and founder of Limited Brands corporation (B.S. 1959)
 Mark Whitacre, COO of Cypress Systems (B.S.  M.S. 1979)
 Kenny Yap, executive chairman of Qian Hu Corporation

Entertainment
 Lee Adams, songwriter; Tony Award winner; inductee into the Songwriters Hall of Fame (B.A.)
 Carole Black, President and CEO of Lifetime Entertainment Services (B.A. 1965)
 Budd Boetticher, film director of classic Westerns, many starring Randolph Scott
 Marc Butan, film producer and founder of MadRiver Pictures (B.A. 1992)
 Ross Butler, actor, 13 Reasons Why
 Don Handfield, film producer, writer, co-creator of Knightfall on History Channel and producer of The Founder (B.A.)
 Margaret Carson, longtime publicist for Leonard Bernstein and Benny Goodman
 Kim Deal, musician, member of The Breeders, formerly of The Pixies and The Amps
 John Donkin, producer of 2007 Academy Award-nominated animated short No Time for Nuts (M.S. 1986)
 Tim Easton, musician alt-country singer
 Mark Eitzel, musician, member of The Naked Skinnies
 Ruby Elzy, break-through African American operatic soprano who created the role of Serena in George Gershwin's folk opera Porgy and Bess (B.S. 1930)
 Dudley Fisher, nationally syndicated cartoonist most known for the Right Around Home strip.  (Did not graduate.)
 Charles W. Fries, film producer and former vice-president of Columbia Pictures, originated the Movie of The Week format (B.A.)
 Alan Freed, disc jockey, widely credited for coining the term "Rock and Roll" 
 Patricia Heaton, Emmy Award-winning actress on Everybody Loves Raymond (B.A., 1980)
 Eileen Heckart, Academy Award, Emmy Award, and Golden Globe Award-winning actress (B.A., 1942)
 Pee Wee Hunt, jazz trombonist, who had a number one hit with the "Twelfth Street Rag" in 1948
 Toni-Leslie James, Costume Designer.(BFA 1979)
 Jim Jinkins, animator and creator of the animated Doug television series
 Tyler Joseph, musician and lead singer of the alternative rock duo Twenty One Pilots
 Melina Kanakaredes, actress, star of Providence and CSI: NY (attended but did not graduate)
 James C. Katz, film restoration expert responsible for restoring the original prints of Rear Window, Lawrence of Arabia and My Fair Lady (B.A. 1960)
 Reuben Klamer, creator of Milton-Bradley's The Game of Life, the Art Linkletter Spin-A-Hoop, Gaylord the Walking Dog, Busy Blocks, and Fisher-Price's training roller skates
 Fred Ladd (né Laderman), producer, considered an industry trailblazer and the first to transform Japanese anime into an American commodity (B.S. 1949)
 Richard Lewis, comedian, actor, writer (B.S. 1969)
 Aleen Leslie, screenwriter
 Gary LeVox, lead singer of the country music group Rascal Flatts
 Patrick Markey, producer of films including A River Runs Through It and White Oleander (B.A.; M.A.)
 Vince Mendoza, musician and composer of jazz (B.A. 1983)
 Ric Ocasek, member of rock group The Cars
 Phil Ochs, 1960s and 70s folk and protest singer and progressive activist (attended journalism school but did not graduate)
 Of a Revolution, rock band of members Marc Roberge, Chris Culos, Richard On, Benj Gershman, and Jerry DePizzo
 Ron O'Neal, actor, Superfly
 Ross Patterson, actor and screenwriter (B.A. 1999)
 Coyote Peterson, Youtuber and wildlife educator at his channel Brave Wilderness
 Jean Peters, varsity cheerleader, Miss Ohio State University, actress, second wife of Howard Hughes
 Jack Renner, founder and CEO of TELARC Classical Records; nominated for 20 Grammy Awards, winning nine (B.S.)
 Gigi Rice, actress (B.A. 1987)
 Kristen Ruhlin, actress, Human Giant, She Wants Me, The Girl in the Park
 Ed Sabol, filmmaker, producer, multiple Emmy Award winner, member of the Pro Football Hall of Fame, co-founder of NFL Films
 Fred Silverman, trendsetting 1970s television executive as president of ABC
 Randy Skinner, director, choreographer, performer (B.S. in Education, 1974)
 Larry Smith, puppeteer and producer of children's programming in the Cincinnati area since 1957
 Richard Stoltzman, musician, Avery Fisher Prize-winning clarinetist, Sony Classical recording artist (B.A. Music / B.S. Mathematics)
 Bruce Vilanch, comedy writer (BFA, 1970)
 Chris Wedge, director of computer animation films including Ice Age and Robots (M.A. Computer Graphics)
 Nar Williams, host of the Science Channel's Science of the Movies
 Norma Jean Wright, lead singer of the late 70s disco band Chic
 Dwight Yoakam, country musician, actor

Journalism
 Andrew Anglin, founder of white supremacist news and commentary website The Daily Stormer
 Les Biederman, sports writer, columnist and editor for The Pittsburgh Press (B.A. 1930)
 Ned Brooks, moderator, Meet the Press
 Jack Buck, Hall of Fame announcer for the St. Louis Cardinals, NFL football announcer, journalist
 Christine Chubbuck, television reporter who committed suicide on live television in 1974
 Len Downie, Jr., journalist, Executive Editor, Washington Post (B.A. 1964, M.A. 1965)
 Hugh Fullerton, sportswriter, uncovered the Black Sox Scandal
 Julia Keller, columnist for Chicago Tribune; 2005 Pulitzer Prize recipient (Ph.D. 1995)
 W.M. Kiplinger, among first two journalism graduates; founder of Kiplinger's
 Brian Lehrer, radio host of The Brian Lehrer Show on New York's WNYC (M.A.)
 Dave Malkoff, Weather Channel correspondent and six-time Emmy Award recipient
 Joel Meyerowitz, photojournalist, Guggenheim Fellow chronicler of the aftermath of the World Trade Center attack (B.A. 1959)
 Judith Miller, former New York Times reporter, 2002 Pulitzer Prize for Explanatory Reporting
 Jerry Mitchell, investigative reporter for The Clarion-Ledger whose reporting helped lead to the conviction of Byron De La Beckwith, youngest recipient of John Chancellor Award for Excellence in Journalism (M.A.)
 Erin Moriarty, CBS news correspondent and nine-time Emmy Award recipient (B.S. 1973; J.D. 1977)
 Reynelda Muse, first woman and first African American to anchor a television news program in Colorado (B.A. 1968)
 Frank Stanton, longtime President of CBS, 1946–73
 Bill Stewart, reporter, foreign correspondent for ABC executed by Nicaraguan government forces (B.A. 1963)
 David Teeuwen ( 1970 –  2015),  managing editor of USA Today where he helped pioneer digital news
 Earl Wilson, New York Post (B.S. 1931)

Law
 Brent Benjamin, Chief Justice of the West Virginia Supreme Court (B.A., J.D.)
 John W. Grabiel, Republican gubernatorial nominee in Arkansas in 1922 and 1924, attorney in Fayetteville, Arkansas (1900)
 Claude M. Hilton, United States District Court judge for the Eastern District of Virginia, judge on the Foreign Intelligence Surveillance Court (B.S. 1963)
 Colleen McMahon, United States Judge for the Southern District of New York (B.A. 1973)
 Thomas J. Moyer, Chief Justice of the Ohio Supreme Court (B.A. 1961 J.D. 1964)
 Paul Pfeifer, current Justice of the Ohio Supreme Court (B.A. 1963 J.D. 1966)
 C. William O'Neill, one-term governor of Ohio, Chief Justice of Ohio Supreme Court (JD 1942)
 Brian Sandoval, 29th Governor of Nevada, former Nevada Attorney General; former United States District Court Judge (J.D. 1989)
 Evelyn Lundberg Stratton, current Justice of the Ohio Supreme Court (J.D. 1978)
 Jeffrey Sutton, federal appeals court judge on the United States Court of Appeals for the Sixth Circuit (J.D. 1990)

Politics, diplomacy and military
 Rutherford B. Hayes, Civil War general, two-time Ohio Governor, and later President of the United States who is given credit, while governor, for turning the early Ohio State Agricultural & Mechanical school into the comprehensive Ohio State University

Current United States senators
 Sherrod Brown, United States Senator from Ohio (M.A., 1981)
 Thomas R. Carper, United States Senator from Delaware (B.A., 1968)
 J. D. Vance, United States Senator from Ohio

Current United States representatives
 Troy Balderson, Ohio's 12th congressional district (B.A. 1984)
 Bob Gibbs, Ohio's 7th congressional district (A.A.S., 1974)
 James Jordan, Ohio's 4th congressional district (B.A.; M.A.) - Assistant wrestling coach, 1987-1995
 Ron Klein, Florida's 22nd congressional district (B.A. 1979)
 Alan Lowenthal, California's 47th congressional district (M.S. Ph.D.)

Diplomats 
 Ljubica Acevska, diplomat, Macedonian Ambassador to the United States (B.A.)
 Amadou Lamine Ba, diplomat, Senegal Ambassador to the United States (B.S. M.S. Ph.D.)
 Chester Crocker, diplomat; former Undersecretary of State for African Affairs; author of United Nations' Namibian Peace Plan (B.A. 1963)
 Alan Fiers, key figure in the Iran-Contra Affair as head of the Central Intelligence Agency's Central American Task Force from 1984 to 1988 (B.A.)
 Cheikh Tidiane Gadio, Senegal Minister of Foreign Affairs (Ph.D.)
 Stephen Kappes, Deputy Director of the Central Intelligence Agency
 Foy D. Kohler, diplomat, former United States Ambassador to the Soviet Union (B.A.)
 Paul A. Russo, Ambassador of the United States to Barbados, Dominica, St Lucia, Antigua, St. Vincent, and St. Christopher-Nevis-Anguilla, 1986-1988
 Roberto Sánchez Vilella, second elected Governor of Puerto Rico (B.S. 1934)
 Dat Tran, acting United States Secretary of Veterans Affairs under Joe Biden
 Milton A. Wolf, diplomat, former United States Ambassador to Austria (B.A. 1948)

Non-American Politicians and Officials 
 Grant Devine, former Progressive Conservative Premier of the Canadian province of Saskatchewan (Ph.D. 1976)
 Joseph Wu, former Chairman of the Mainland Affairs Council; first and only non-KMT-affiliated Representative to the United States of the Republic of China (Ph.D. 1989)
 Andrew McIntosh, British Labour Party Politician, Whip and culture spokesman of the House of Lords
 Abdinur Sheikh Mohamed, Somali educator and politician; former Minister of Education, Higher Education and Culture of Somalia
 Jayaprakash Narayan, Indian freedom fighter, social reformer, politician
 Dr Stephen Oru, Minister of the Federal Republic of Nigeria
 Duvvuri Subbarao, Governor of the Reserve Bank of India (B.S.; M.S. 1978)

State politicians
 Javier Rivera Aquino, member of the Puerto Rico House of Representatives; Secretary of the Puerto Rico Department of Agriculture (B.S. 1996)
 Tony Dale, Republican member of the Texas House of Representatives from suburban Austin, Texas (B.A. Political Science)
 Grace Towns Hamilton, first African American woman elected to the Georgia General Assembly (Masters in Psychology 1929)
 John Kasich, Governor and former Congressman from Central Ohio (B.A. 1974)
 Robert S. Kiss, Speaker, West Virginia Legislature (B.A. J.D.)
 Ron Klein, Minority Leader, Florida Senate (B.A. 1979)

Ohio Senate
 Jim Hughes, Ohio Senate, from the 16th district
 Kris Jordan, Ohio Senate from the 19th district
 Frank LaRose, Ohio Senate from the 27th district
 Tom Niehaus, 93rd President of the Ohio Senate from the 14th district
 Larry Obhof, 95th President of the Ohio Senate from the 22nd district
 Robert Shaw, Ohio Senate from the 16th District, 1967–1972
 Mark Wagoner, Ohio Senate from the 2nd district

Ohio House of Representatives
 William G. Batchelder, Ohio House of Representative from the 69th district
 Andrew Brenner, Ohio House of Representative from the 2nd district
 John Patrick Carney, Ohio House of Representative from the 22nd district
 Kathleen Clyde, Ohio House of Representative from the 68th district
 Mike Duffey, Ohio House of Representative from the 21st district
 Bill Hayes, Ohio House of Representative from the 91st district
 Brian Hill, Ohio House of Representative from the 94th district
 Clayton Luckie, Ohio House of Representative from the 39th district
 Bob Peterson, Ohio House of Representative from the 85th district
 Larry Price, Ohio House of Representative from the 26 District 
 Dan Ramos, Ohio House of Representative from the 56th district
 Stephen Slesnick, Ohio House of Representative from the 52nd district
 Peter Stautberg, Ohio House of Representative from the 34th district
 Gerald Stebelton, Ohio House of Representative from the 5th district
 Fred Strahorn, Ohio House of Representative from the 39th district

Former politicians
 Chester Hardy Aldrich, one-term Governor of Nebraska and former Justice of the Nebraska Supreme Court (B.A. 1888)
 Laurie Calvin Battle, former professor at Ohio State University; U.S. Representative from Alabama (M.A. 1939)
 John W. Bricker, three-term Governor of Ohio; Republican vice presidential nominee in 1944; two-term United States Senator from Ohio; co-founder of Bricker & Eckler law firm; associated with the Bricker Amendment, a series of proposed changes to the US Constitution that would have limited the US president's ability to make treaties and executive agreements (B.A. 1916; J.D. 1920)
 Dan Crippen, former Director of the Congressional Budget Office (M.A. 1976, Ph.D. 1981)
 Israel Moore Foster, U.S. Representative from Ohio
 Richard A. Heyman (c. 1935-1994), Mayor of Key West Florida, one of the first openly gay politicians in the US (1957)
 Dave Hobson, Ohio's 7th congressional district,  (J.D. 1963)
 William M. McCulloch, twelve-term former Congressman from Ohio (J.D. 1925)
 James H. McGee, longest serving mayor of Dayton, Ohio (J.D.)
 Oliver McGee, former U.S. Deputy Assistant Secretary of Transportation for Technology Policy (1999–2001) (B.S. 1981)
 Howard Metzenbaum, former United States Senator (B.A., 1939; J.D., 1941)
 William H. Natcher, fifteen-term former Congressman from Kentucky, noted for never taking political contributions (J.D. 1933)
 Mike Oxley, former U.S. Representative from Ohio's 4th district (J.D. 1969)
 Deborah Pryce, former Congresswoman of Ohio's 15th congressional district (B.A. 1973)
 James A. Rhodes, former four-term (non-consecutive) Governor of Ohio; former Mayor of Columbus, Ohio; former Ohio State Auditor (attended but did not graduate)
 William B. Saxbe, United States Senator from Ohio, United States Attorney General, United States Ambassador to India (BA 1940; JD 1948)
 Robert M. Switzer, former United States Representative from Ohio
 Steve Stivers, Ohio's 15th congressional district (B.A. 1989)
 George Voinovich, former United States Senator from Ohio; former Governor of Ohio (J.D.)
 John M. Vorys, nine-term former Congressman from Ohio, 1951 delegate to the United Nations (J.D. 1923)
 Michael R. White, longest-serving Mayor of Cleveland (B.A. 1973, MPA 1974)
 Chalmers P. Wylie, thirteen-term former Congressman from Ohio (B.A.)
 Pat Tiberi, Ohio's 12th congressional district (B.A., 1985)

Military
 Jesse L. Brown, first African American Navy pilot, received Navy Distinguished Flying Cross
 Clovis E. Byers, Chief of Staff, Eighth United States Army
 Walter J. Davis Jr., United States Navy Vice Admiral (B.S.)
 Robert L. Eichelberger, Superintendent of the United States Military Academy; Commander of the Eighth United States Army in the South West Pacific theater in World War II
 Stanley H. Ford, United States Army General (Bachelor of Philosophy 1898)
 Curtis LeMay, United States Air Force general (World War II and Cold War) (B.S. 1928)
 Geoffrey Miller, United States Army major general (B.A.)
 John M. Murray, United States Army, general
 Robert W. Parker, United States Air Force general
 Robert R. Scott, awarded the Medal of Honor in World War II; namesake of destroyer escort USS Scott (DE-214) and OSU's Scott House dormitory
 Douglas M. Webster, Lieutenant Junior Grade, U.S. Navy; lost in the Pacific Ocean December 5, 1965, when his A-4 Skyhawk, armed with a B43 nuclear bomb, rolled off the elevator of the USS Ticonderoga (CVA-14) in a Broken Arrow not acknowledged by the Pentagon until 1981

Science, engineering, and architecture
Amy Acton, director of Ohio Department of Health during the COVID-19 pandemic (MPH)
Homer Burton Adkins, organic chemist who developed the Adkins catalyst (Ph.D. 1918)
 Mahzarin Rustum Banaji, psychologist and Professor of Psychology at Harvard University (M.A. 1982, Ph.D. 1986)
 Charles Bassett, astronaut
 Grace Marie Bareis, mathematician 
 Margaret W. "Hap" Brennecke, NASA metallurgist who contributed to the Saturn rocket program
 James M. Bobbitt, chemist and professor at the University of Connecticut (Ph.D. 1955) 
 Hendrik Wade Bode, scientist and engineer with numerous civilian and military contributions (B.S. 1924, M.S. 1926)
 Thomas D. Brock, microbiologist who discovered hyperthermophiles living in hot springs at Yellowstone National Park
 Marie Skodak Crissey, developmental and educational psychologist, served as president of two divisions of the American Psychological Association (Undergraduate education; Masters of clinical psychology, 1931)
 Nancy J. Currie, astronaut on STS-57, STS-70, STS-88, STS-109 (B.A. 1980)
 Melvin De Groote, prolific chemist, with the second most patents in the US, next to Edison
 Agnes Meyer Driscoll, cryptanalyst deciphered Japanese Naval Codes before and during World War II (B.A. 1911)
 Jewell James Ebers, transistor engineer (MS 1947, PhD 1950)
 Bertha Lamme Feicht, first female engineering graduate; first female engineer to be hired by Westinghouse (B.S. 1893)
 Feng Yunhe, Chinese politician, Minister of Textile Industry 1949–1954, one of first women female cabinet ministers in China, an expert in ramie fibre and considered to be first woman to earn PhD in chemical engineering in US. 
 Judah Folkman, scientist; Harvard medical researcher; cancer researcher (B.S. 1953)
 Gerard Fowke, geologist and archeologist
 Barbara A. Given, nursing professor and psychosocial oncologist
 Erica Glasper, American behavioral neuroscientist (M.A. Psychology)
 Henry J. Hatch, engineer, Lt. General, former Army Chief of Engineers (M.S.)
 Henry W. Hofstetter, past president of the American Optometric Association and a member of the National Optometry Hall of Fame (M.S. 1940, Ph.D. 1942)
 Rod Holt, developed the unique method of power supply for Apple Inc.'s 1977 Apple II
 David A. Huffman, computer scientist (B.S. 1944,  M.S. 1949)
 Christina Hulbe, Antarctic researcher, glaciologist (MSc 1994)
 Charles Kettering, electrical engineer; founder of Delco; Vice President of Research for General Motors; invented electric starter for automobiles; co-founder (with Alfred Sloan) of Sloan-Kettering Cancer Center in 1945 (B.S. 1904)
 Benjamin G. Lamme, engineer; longtime head of engineering at Westinghouse; pioneered the design of rotary converters; developed direct current railway motors; produced the first commercially successful induction motor (B.S. 1888)
 Robert Henry Lawrence, Jr., first African-American NASA astronaut (Ph.D. Chemistry 1965)
 Richard M. Linnehan, astronaut (DVM 1985)
 Nigel Lockyer, Director of Fermilab since September 2013 (Ph.D. 1980)
 Ralph D. Mershon, engineer, inventor, and benefactor
 John L. Moll, engineer, pioneer in the use of silicon transistors at Bell Labs, Stanford University and Hewlett-Packard (B.S. 1943, Ph.D. 1952)
 Ruth Ella Moore, bacteriologist, microbiologist, academician, professor and department head at Howard University, first African American woman to receive a doctorate degree in bacteriology (B.S. 1926, M.A. 1927, Ph.D. 1933), and fashion designer 
 Russell C. Newhouse, engineer, pioneer in development of radio altimeter for aircraft, Bell Labs (B.S. EE 1929)
 Julie Palais, Antarctic researcher, glaciologist (M.S., Ph.D.)
 Roy Plunkett, inventor of teflon (Ph.D. 1936)
 Douglas Prasher, discoverer of green fluorescent protein (GFP) gene (Ph.D. 1979)
 Karl Probst, engineer, inventor of the Jeep (B.S. 1906)
 Frederick Patterson, the first African-American to manufacture cars with C.R. Patterson and Sons. He developed the Patterson-Greenfield car and was in direct competition with Henry Ford's Model T.
 Wallace Clement Sabine, architect; Harvard professor; founder of the field of modern architectural acoustics; acoustical architect of Boston's Symphony Hall (B.S. 1886)
 Wolfram Samlowski, oncologist
 Larry Sanger, co-founder of Wikipedia (Ph.D., 2000)
 R. Tom Sawyer, inventor of the first successful gas turbine locomotive and assisted with the development of the diesel locomotive (B.S. 1923, M.S. 1930)
 Betty Schmoll, founder of Hospice of Dayton, one of the first hospice programs in the United States (M.S. 1978)
 Ronald M. Sega, astronaut (M.S. 1975)
 Robert Slocum, botanist and biologist (M.S. 1977)
 Howard Dwight Smith, Ohio Stadium architect (B.S. 1907)
 Thamotharam Somasekaram, Sri Lankan Tamil geographer, Surveyor General of Sri Lanka from 1991 to 1992
 Claude Steele, psychologist and professor of psychology at Stanford University (Ph.D. 1971)
 Esther S. Takeuchi, bioengineer; chief scientist at Greatbatch; inventor of the microbatteries that made implantable defibrillators possible (Ph.D.)
 Sidney van den Bergh, Canadian astronomer who served as president of the Canadian Astronomical Society and as vice president of the International Astronomical Union; namesake of asteroid 4230 van den Bergh (M.S.)
 Charles E. Waring, physical chemist and long-time professor at the University of Connecticut (M.S. 1934, Ph.D. 1936)
 Quentin D. Wheeler, entomologist and taxonomist, president of ESF (B.S. 1976; M.S. 1977; Ph.D. 1980)

Others
 Robert Bales, former United States Army soldier responsible for the Kandahar massacre (left 1996, didn't graduate)
 Jeffrey Dahmer, serial killer and cannibal (Left after one quarter with a 0.45/4.00 GPA)
 Paul Ebert, pediatric heart surgeon; former director of the American College of Surgeons; former chairman of the Departments of Surgery at both Cornell University Medical College and the University of California San Francisco Medical Center (B.S. M.D)
 Ray Evans editorial cartoonist
Mantaro Hashimoto, linguist and sinologist
 Wilson A. Head, sociologist, activist in race relations, peace and the abolition of prisons (doctoral degree in Sociology, Adult Education, and Social Psychology, 1958)
 Ammon Hennacy, social critic and reformer
 Stephanie Hightower, President of USA Track & Field
 Joe Kenda, Colorado Springs Police Department homicide detective, host of Investigation Discovery documentary series Homicide Hunter (M.A. 1970)
 Bill Kraus, gay rights and AIDS activist; former Congressional aide who served as a liaison between the San Francisco gay community and congress in the 1980s
 Judith McCulloh, folklorist, ethnomusicologist, and university press editor (M.A.)
 Roger McMurrin, conductor and Presbyterian pastor
 Jerrie Mock, aviator, first woman to successfully fly solo around the world (B.S.)
 Dillon S. Myer, director of War Relocation Authority during World War II and commissioner of Bureau of Indian Affairs (1914)
 Keo Nakama, athlete; first person to verifiably swim an open water Hawaiian channel; OSU swimming record holder, 1943, 1944
 Jim Reeder, coach; California State University Hall of Fame Charter Member; namesake for the baseball field at California State University, Los Angeles
 Ann Shaw (1921–2015), civic leader and social worker based in Los Angeles, California (M.S. Speech, 1944)
 Mike Sexton, professional poker player; host of the World Poker Tour
 Brian Shaffer, undergraduate alumnus and medical student who disappeared from a Columbus bar in 2006
 Faye Wattleton, activist; former president of Planned Parenthood of America; co-founder of Center for the Advancement of Women (B.S. 1964)
 Tim Phillips (swimmer), athlete; World Champion swimmer

Athletics

Olympic medalists
Ohio State has produced over 200 Olympic athletes, including the following medalists.
 David Albritton, track and field 1936 Summer Olympics silver medal
 Miller Anderson, diving 1948 Summer Olympics silver medal; 1952 Helsinki Olympic Games silver medal
 Aldis Berzins, volleyball 1984 Summer Olympics gold medal
 Raj Bhavsar, gymnastics 2008 Summer Olympics bronze medal
 Tessa Bonhomme, Canada women's ice hockey 2010 Winter Olympics gold medal
 Juan Botella, Mexico, diving 1960 Summer Olympics bronze medal
 Nathan Brooks, boxing 1952 Summer Olympics gold medal
 Jennifer Chandler, diving 1976 Summer Olympics gold medal
 Lisa Chesson, women's ice hockey 2010 Winter Olympics silver medal
 Mary Ellen Clark, diving 1992 Summer Olympics bronze medal; 1996 Atlanta Olympic Games bronze medal
 Bob Clotworthy, diving 1952 Helsinki Olympic Games bronze medal; 1956 Melbourne Olympic Games gold medal
 Gerald Cole, track and field 1952 Helsinki Olympic Games silver medal
 Glenn Davis, track and field 1956 Melbourne Olympic Games gold medal; 1960 Rome Olympic Games two gold medals
 Diane Dixon, track and field 1984 Los Angeles Olympic Games silver medal;  1988 Seoul Olympic Games silver medal
 James George, weightlifting 1956 Melbourne Olympic Games bronze medal; 1960 Rome Olympic Games silver medal
 Peter George, weightlifting 1948 London Olympic Games silver medal; 1952 Helsinki Olympic Games gold Medal; 1956 Melbourne Olympic Games silver medal
 Joe Greene, track and field 1992 Barcelona Olympic Games bronze medal; 1996 Atlanta Olympic Games bronze medal
 Sam Hall, diving 1960 Rome Olympic Games silver medal
 Morgan Hamm, gymnastics 2004 Athens Olympic Games silver medal
 Paul Hamm, gymnastics 2004 Athens Olympic Games gold medal, two silver medals
 Bruce Harlan, diving 1948 London Olympic Games gold medal, silver medal
 Donald Harper, diving 1956 Melbourne Olympic Games silver medal
 Bill Hosket, Sr., basketball Big Ten Conference championship in 1933
 Bill Hosket, Jr., basketball 1968 Summer Olympics gold medal
 Karen Josephson, synchronized swimming, 1988 Seoul Olympic Games silver medal; 1992 Barcelona Olympic Games gold medal
 Sarah Josephson, synchronized swimming1984 Los Angeles Olympic Games silver medal; 1988 Seoul Olympic Games silver medal; 1992 Barcelona Olympic Games gold medal
 Ryan Kesler, men's ice hockey, 2010 Vancouver Winter Olympics, silver medal
 Ford Hiroshi Konno, swimming 1952 Helsinki Olympic Games two gold medals, silver medal; 1956 Melbourne Olympic Games silver medal
 Emma Laaksonen, Finland women's hockey, 1998 Winter Olympics bronze medal; 2010 Winter Olympics bronze medal
 Jerry Lucas, basketball 1960 Rome Olympic Games gold medal
 Kelly McCormick, diving 1984 Los Angeles Olympic Games bronze medal; 1988 Seoul Olympic Games silver medal
 Jesse Owens, track and field 1936 Berlin Olympic Games four gold medals
 Yoshi Oyakawa, swimming 1952 Helsinki Olympic Games gold medal
 Jerry Page, boxing 1984 Los Angeles Olympic Games gold medal
 Lea Ann Parsley, skeleton, 2002 Winter Olympics silver medal
 Michael Redd, basketball 2008 Beijing Olympic Games gold medal
 Butch Reynolds, track and field 1988 Seoul Olympic Games gold medal, silver medal
 Jason Rodgers, Fencing, 2008 Summer Olympics silver medal
 Gordy Sheer, luge, 1998 Winter Olympics silver medal
 George Simpson, track and field, 1932 Los Angeles Olympic Games silver medal
 Bill Smith, swimming 1948 London Olympic Games two gold medals
 Katie Smith, WNBA player; basketball 2000 Summer Olympics gold medal; 2004 Athens Olympic Games gold medal; 2008 Beijing Olympic Games gold medal
 Natalie Spooner, Canada women's ice hockey 2014 Winter Olympics gold medal, 2018 Winter Olympics silver medal
 Jack Taylor, swimming 1952 Summer Olympics bronze medal
 Hanna Thompson, fencing 2008 Summer Olympics silver medal
 Minttu Tuominen, Finland women's ice hockey 2010 Winter Olympics bronze medal
 Bryan Volpenhein, rowing 2004 Summer Olympics gold medal; 2008 Summer Olympics bronze medal
 Marc Waldie, volleyball 1984 Los Angeles Olympic Games gold medal
 Malden Whitfield, track and field 1948 London Olympic Games two gold medals, bronze medal; 1952 Helsinki Olympic Games gold medal; silver medal
 Blaine Wilson, gymnastics 2004 Athens Olympic Games silver medal

Baseball
 Steve Arlin, MLB pitcher (1969–1974)
 Barry Bonnell, MLB outfielder (1977–1986)
 Chuck Brinkman, MLB catcher (1969–1974)
 Dave Burba, MLB pitcher (1990–2004)
 Galen Cisco, MLB pitcher (1961–1969)
 Rollin Cook, MLB pitcher (1915)
 John Dagenhard, MLB pitcher (1943)
 Mark Dempsey, MLB pitcher (1982)
 Johnny Edwards, MLB catcher
 Brad Goldberg, MLB pitcher
 Frank Howard, MLB outfielder
 Cory Luebke, MLB pitcher (2010–present)
 Jim Reeder, lettered in three varsity sports at OSU; World War II prevented him from playing Major League Baseball; upon his death California State University at Los Angeles renamed their baseball field the James B. Reeder Memorial Field to honor their long-time head coach; he never had a losing season as Cal State's head coach (B.S. 1948)
Moe Savransky (born 1929), MLB pitcher (1954)
 George Steinbrenner, New York Yankees owner
 Nick Swisher, MLB outfielder, World Series Champion 2009 New York Yankees

Basketball
 William Buford, former basketball player at Ohio State
 Mike Conley, Jr., 4th overall selection in the 2007 NBA Draft of the Memphis Grizzlies, NBA player for the Utah Jazz
 Daequan Cook, NBA player for the Houston Rockets
 Aaron Craft, professional basketball player for AS Monaco
 Jon Diebler, player for the Panionios B.C.
 John Havlicek, NBA star, Basketball Hall of Fame
 Othello Hunter, NBA player for the Atlanta Hawks and in the Israeli Basketball Premier League
 Jim Jackson, former NBA player
 Chris Jent, former NBA player and current Ohio State assistant coach
 Neil Johnston, NBA player and coach, Basketball Hall of Fame
 Roger Jorgensen, BAA player
 Clark Kellogg, former NBA player, TV sports analyst
 Bobby Knight, coach at Texas Tech University, Basketball Hall of Fame (B.A. 1962)
 Kosta Koufos, NBA player for the Sacramento Kings
 Ron Lewis, basketball player for Ironi Nahariya from the Israeli Super League
 Jerry Lucas (1958–1962), NBA star, Basketball Hall of Fame
 Mark Minor, former NBA player
 Kelsey Mitchell, first Team All-American, 2016, 2nd Team All-American, 2015, 2017, 2018, WNBA player for the Indiana Fever, selected 2nd overall
 B. J. Mullens, 24th draft pick in the 2009 NBA Draft (2008–2009)
 Greg Oden, first Team All-American, 2007, selected with the number one pick of the 2007 NBA Draft by the Portland Trail Blazers  (2006–2007)
 Scoonie Penn, Euroleague player
 Michael Redd, NBA player for the Milwaukee Bucks (1997–2000)
 Arnie Risen, four-time NBA all-star, Basketball Hall of Fame
 Evan Ravenel, current free agent.
 LaQuinton Ross (born 1991), American basketball player for Hapoel Eilat of the Israeli Basketball Premier League
 D'Angelo Russell, 2nd overall pick in 2015 NBA Draft by Los Angeles Lakers, NBA player for the Minnesota Timberwolves
 Brad Sellers, former NBA player
 Jim Smith, former NBA player
 Jared Sullinger, former NBA player
 Fred R. Taylor, long-time former OSU head basketball coach, Basketball Hall of Fame
 Evan Turner, NCAA Player of the Year, former NBA player
 Trevor Thompson, current free agent
 Bob Weltlich, former University of Texas coach, author of the novel Crooked Zebra
 Herb Williams
 Daequan Cook (born 1987), basketball player in the Israeli Basketball Premier League
 Jon Diebler (born 1988), basketball player in the Israel Basketball Premier League
Lenzelle Smith Jr. (born 1991), basketball player in the Israel Basketball Premier League
Kaleb Wesson (born 1999), basketball player for Maccabi Rishon LeZion of the Israeli Basketball Premier League

Football
For a more complete list of Ohio State University alumni in the NFL see: Buckeyes in the NFL
 Eli Apple, NFL cornerback for the New York Giants
 Brian Baschnagel, wide receiver for the Chicago Bears
 Joey Bosa, NFL defensive end for the Los Angeles Chargers
 Nick Bosa, NFL defensive end for the San Francisco 49ers
 Paul Brown, coach, member of the Pro Football Hall of Fame, and namesake of Cleveland Browns (M.A. 1940)
 Earle Bruce, College Football Hall of Fame coach
 Connie Carberg, first female NFL scout
 Cris Carter, former NFL wide receiver, Pro Football Hall of Fame member
 Howard "Hopalong" Cassady, Heisman Trophy winner 1955
 Frank Clair, Canadian Football Hall of Fame coach
 Joe Cooper, Calgary Stampeders player
 Tom Cousineau, former linebacker, Montreal Alouettes, Cleveland Browns first pick of the 1979 NFL Draft
 Mike Doss, NFL safety for the Minnesota Vikings, three-time All-American
 Nate Ebner, NFL safety for the New England Patriots and rugby Olympian
 Byron Eby, football player
 Quinn Ewers, first student-athlete to make more than $1 million from endorsements
 Wes Fesler, three-time All-American end; coach
 John E. Frank, NFL tight end
 Jake Gaither, head coach at Florida A&M
 Eddie George, Heisman Trophy winner 1995, former NFL football player
 Sid Gillman, NFL coach and Pro Football Hall of Fame
 Ted Ginn Jr., NFL wide receiver for the Carolina Panthers
 Terry Glenn, NFL wide receiver for the Dallas Cowboys; 1995 Biletnikoff Award winner
 Randy Gradishar, NFL linebacker, College Football Hall of Fame member
 Archie Griffin, only two-time Heisman Trophy winner (1974, 1975); current president of the Ohio State University Alumni Association
 Lou Groza, football kicker and Pro Football Hall of Famer, Lou Groza Award namesake
 Chic Harley, three-time All-American running back
 Dwayne Haskins, NFL quarterback for the Washington Redskins, 2018 Big Ten Offensive Player of the Year, 2019 Rose Bowl MVP
 A. J. Hawk, NFL linebacker for the Green Bay Packers, 2005 Lombardi Award recipient
 Woody Hayes, Ohio State football coach and educator (M.A.)
 Kirk Herbstreit, ESPN sports analyst and former OSU quarterback
 John Hicks, 1973 winner of Outland Trophy and Lombardi Award
 Les Horvath, Heisman Trophy winner 1943
 Cardale Jones, NFL quarterback for the Los Angeles Chargers
 Vic Janowicz, Heisman Trophy winner 1950
 Pete Johnson, NFL running back
 Dante Lavelli, Pro Football Hall of Fame inductee (1945)
 Dick LeBeau, Pittsburgh Steelers defensive coordinator Pro Football Hall of Fame inductee (2010)
 Dick Logan, NFL guard for the Green Bay Packers
 Nick Mangold, former NFL center for the New York Jets, 2-time pro bowler
 Terry McLaurin, NFL wide receiver for the Washington Redskins
 Urban Meyer, head coach of Ohio State Football (M.A. 1988)
 Braxton Miller, wide receiver for Houston Texans
 Mike Nugent, NFL placekicker for the Cincinnati Bengals
 Orlando Pace, NFL offensive lineman Chicago Bears; winner of 1995 Outland Trophy and the 1994 and 1995 Lombardi Award; first pick of the 1996 NFL Draft
 Jim Parker, offensive tackle for the Baltimore Colts and Pro Football Hall of Fame
 Dwight Peabody, NFL end
 Pete Perini, NFL fullback
 Ev Rowan, NFL end
 Steve Ruzich, NFL guard for the Green Bay Packers
 Glenn E. "Bo" Schembechler, former football coach of the Michigan Wolverines (Master's 1952)
 Tom Skladany, three-time All-American punter and former professional football player, Detroit Lions, Philadelphia Eagles
 Troy Smith, 2006 Heisman Trophy winner, former NFL Player
 Chris Spielman, former NFL linebacker with the Detroit Lions, Buffalo Bills and Cleveland Browns; 1987 Lombardi Award recipient
 Shawn Springs, NFL cornerback for the New England Patriots
 Jim Stillwagon, Canadian Football League player, 1970 winner of Outland Trophy and Lombardi Award
 Don Sutherin, Canadian Football Hall of Fame defensive back
 Jack Tatum, football player for the Oakland Raiders, author
 Paul Warfield, Pro Football Hall of Fame wide receiver
 Dan Wilkinson, NFL Defensive Lineman, first pick of the 1994 NFL draft
 Joe Williams, football player
 Bill Willis, Pro Football Hall of Famer; first African-American pro football player
 Antoine Winfield, NFL cornerback for the Minnesota Vikings; 1998 Jim Thorpe Award winner
 Terrelle Pryor, an NFL wide receiver. Drafted in the 3rd round of the 2011 NFL Draft as a quarterback.
 Shane Falco, All-American quarterback

Golf
 Ryan Armour, PGA Tour
John Cook, PGA Champions Tour
 Bo Hoag, PGA Tour
Rosie Jones, retired LPGA Tour
 Meg Mallon, retired LPGA Tour
Jerry McGee, retired PGA and Champions Tour
Gary Nicklaus, professional golfer
 Jack Nicklaus, retired professional golfer, holds the record for most Major Championships (18)
 Joey Sindelar, PGA Champions Tour
 Chris Smith, former PGA Tour
 Rod Spittle, former PGA Champions Tour
 Tom Weiskopf, retired PGA and Champions Tour

Hockey
 Tom Askey, retired goaltender for the Mighty Ducks of Anaheim and various European pro teams
 Mike Bales, NHL ice hockey goalie, currently playing for the Straubing Tigers (DEL)
 Mathieu Beaudoin, current NHL player with Phoenix Coyotes
 Sean Collins, current NHL player for the New York Rangers
 Zac Dalpe, current NHL player with the Rochester Americans (AHL)
 Ryan Dzingel, current player with the Ottawa Senators
 Corey Elkins, current player/left wing with HIFK (Liiga)
 Nate Guenin, current NHL player with the Colorado Avalanche
 Ryan Kesler, current NHL player with the Anaheim Ducks
 Tanner Laczynski, current NHL player with the Philadelphia Flyers
 Jamie Macoun, longtime veteran defenceman in the NHL
 Jeff Madill, retired NHL player with the New Jersey Devils
 Bill McKenzie, retired NHL goaltender
 Éric Meloche, former professional player, Philadelphia Flyers and the Pittsburgh Penguins
 Rod Pelley, currently playing for the Albany Devils (AHL)
 Dave Steckel, current player for the Norfolk Admirals (AHL)
 Tyson Strachan, current NHL player/defenseman with the Buffalo Sabres
 R.J. Umberger, current player/center in the NHL for the Philadelphia Flyers
 Jim Witherspoon, retired NHL player/defenseman with the Los Angeles Kings

Rowing
 Erden Eruç, first solo human-powered circumnavigator of the Earth with multiple Guinness world records for ocean rowing

Shooting (pistol) 
 James Howard Snook, gold medal at the 1920 Summer Olympics at Antwerp; 1908 graduate from OSU College of Veterinary Medicine; also served on faculty; inventor of the "snook hook" surgical instrument; executed in February 1930 for murder

Soccer
 Eric Brunner, Houston Dynamo
 Ray Burse, goalkeeper, Puerto Rico Islanders
 Roger Espinoza, Sporting Kansas City
 Dustin Kirby, Real Salt Lake
 Kyle Veris, LA Galaxy and top European clubs

Swimming
 Ernest W. Maglischo, swimming coach for 38 years, coach of the year, and author.

Wrestling
 Mark Coleman, NCAA Champion wrestler (190 lbs); silver medalist at the 1991 FILA Wrestling World Championships; retired professional mixed martial artist; former UFC Light Heavyweight Champion; UFC Hall of Fame member
 Lance Palmer, four-time Ohio State wrestling champ, four-time All-American wrestler; professional Mixed Martial Artist, former WSOF Champion
 Kevin Randleman, two-time NCAA Champion (1992 & 1993) and runner-up wrestler (1991); former UFC Heavyweight Champion
 Logan Stieber, five time HS Champion wrestler, four time NCAA Champion wrestler
 Kyle Snyder two time NCAA Champion wrestler, World Champion, Olympic Champion
 Jim Jordan - assistant coach 1987-1995 (elected to Ohio congress in 1994, US congress in 2006)
 Richard Strauss - team doctor, committed suicide in 2005, age 67

Notable current faculty

National Academy of Sciences members
 Carlo Croce, medicine and genetics
 Avner Friedman, mathematics
 Leo Paquette, chemistry
 Duane W. Roller, Professor Emeritus of Classics
 Lonnie G. Thompson, geology, Tyler Prize-winning glaciologist (M.S. 1971 Ph.D. 1976)

National Academy of Engineering members
 Jose B. Cruz, Jr., electrical engineering

Institute of Medicine of the National Academies Members
 Clara D. Bloomfield

Arts, humanities, and social sciences
 Kevin Boyle, National Book Award winner and Pulitzer Prize finalist for Arc of Justice: A Saga of Race, Civil Rights and Murder in the Jazz Age (History, 2004)
 Henri Cole, poetry, awards include a Guggenheim Fellowship and a Pulitzer Prize finalist
 Charles Csuri, art and computer graphics, influential artist and scholar; father of digital art and computer animation (BFA 1946; MFA 1948)
 Tim Griffin, art history, former curator-in-chief of The Kitchen and editor-in-chief of ArtForum International
 Ann Hamilton, sculpture; 1993 MacArthur Fellow; 2008 Heinz Award recipient
 Trevon Logan, Hazel C. Youngberg Trustees Distinguished Professor in the Department of Economics
 Lea McGee, professor emeritus of early literacy
 Tony Mendoza, photography
 Bebe Miller, dance; Guggenheim Fellow; founder of Bebe Miller Dance Company (M.A. 1975)
 John Mueller, political science; Guggenheim Fellow; holds the Wayne Woodrow Hayes Chair in National Security Studies; winner of Georgetown University's Lepgold Prize for the best book on international relations for The Remnants of War
 Geoffrey Parker, Andreas Dorpalen Professor of history
 Alexander Wendt, political science; Ralph D. Mershon Professor of International Security; named the third most influential scholar of international relations by Foreign Policy magazine
E. J. Westlake, Chair of Theatre, Film, and Media Arts, Fulbright scholar, winner of the Oregon Book Award, and former editor of Theatre Journal.

Math and physical sciences 
 George Billman, physiology
 Paul R. Berger, electrical and computer engineering, award IEEE Fellow (2011), Outstanding Engineering Educator for State of Ohio (2014) and Fulbright-Nokia Distinguished Chair in Information and Communications Technologies (2020).
 Bharat Bhushan, Ohio Eminent Scholar and the Howard D. Winbigler Professor, College of Engineering
 Rick Freuler, professor and coordinator of the Fundamentals of Engineering for Honors program
 Harvey Friedman, mathematics and logic
 Charles Chidume, mathematician and university professor (1984 PhD)
 Maryam Lustberg, breast oncologist
 William J. Mitsch, environmental science, awarded 2004 Stockholm Water Prize for wetlands research
 William Pease, medicine 
 Altaf Wani, radiology 
 Terry Jean Wilson, geologist, Antarctic researcher
 David W. Wood, chemical and biomolecular engineering

School of Physical Activity and Educational Services
 Gwendolyn Cartledge Professor

Notable former faculty members
Arts and humanities
 Edgar S. Furniss Jr., Mershon Professor of Political Science and the first director of the Mershon Center for International Security Studies, 1960-1966
 John C. Rule, professor of history, 1958–1995
 Thyrsa Frazier Svager, professor, 1954-1987; Provost, 1987-1993
 Stephen V. Tracy, professor of Greek & Latin, 1971-2002; creator and first director of the Center for Epigraphic and Paleographic Studies

National Academy of Science Members

Bernadine Healy, cardiology, former head of the National Institutes of Health and the American Red Cross, 1995-1999
Kenneth G. Wilson, physics, 1982-2008, Nobel laureate

Presidents of the Ohio State University

The first president of Ohio Agricultural and Mechanical College is Edward Orton, Sr., who served from 1873 to 1881. During Orton's term, the university became Ohio State University, in 1878. Karen A. Holbrook took office in 2002 and was the first female president. E. Gordon Gee is the only president who served two terms, after from serving from 1990 to 1998 and returning in 2007-2013. Michael V. Drake took office in 2014 and was the first African American President of the university before leaving in 2020 to become the president of the University of California. Kristina M. Johnson, previously the chancellor of the State University of New York, began her term as university president on August 24, 2020.

References

 
Ohio State University